The 2007–08 OFC Champions League was the 7th edition of the Oceanian Club Championship, Oceania's premier club football tournament organized by the Oceania Football Confederation (OFC), and the 2nd season under the current OFC Champions League name. The qualifying round was held at Stade Numa-Daly in Nouméa, New Caledonia, from 12 to 16 February 2007, with the main competition taking the form of a home and away group stage followed by a knockout round, which was played from 27 October 2007 until 11 May 2008.

The qualifying round was contested by teams from the three lowest ranked nations in Oceania and Vanuatu, who lost their automatic qualification place due to the withdrawal of their representative in the previous year's competition.

The winner of the tournament was Waitakere Utd of New Zealand, who reclaimed their title by beating Kossa FC of the Solomon Islands in the two legged final. The winners claimed Oceania's US$1 million (NZ$1.41 million) berth in the 2008 FIFA Club World Cup in Japan.

Participants

The following teams entered the competition.

Notes

OFC O-League preliminary tournament
The Preliminary Tournament was played at Stade Numa-Daly Magenta in Nouméa, New Caledonia.

Group stage

Group A

Group B

Final

Waitakere United win 6–3 on aggregate and advance to the 2008 FIFA Club World Cup.

Top goal-scorers

References
OceaniaFootball

2007-08
1